John Strawson is an author and law professor at the University of East London School of Law, where he teaches International law and Middle East Studies.  He specialises in the area of law and postcolonialism, with particular reference to the middle east, Islam and international law.

His previous posts include visiting positions at Birzeit University (Palestine) and the Institute of Social Studies (The Hague Netherlands).

One of the themes in the research undertaken by John Strawson is the encounter between western and Islamic law.

He is Director of Law Postgraduate Programmes at the University of East London, and Director of the Centre on Human Rights in Conflict.

Views on Israel
According to Strawson, the use of the term apartheid to describe Israel or Israeli policies has become commonplace in certain liberal and leftist circles. Strawson wrote that this label does not apply to Israel, and suggests that the use of the apartheid analogy is casual, unhistorical, and unhelpful.

Books
 Encountering Islamic law, by John Strawson, 2000
 Partitioning Palestine: Legal Fundamentalism in the Palestinian-Israeli Conflict. Pluto Press, 2010. 
 (ed.) Law after Ground Zero (London, Sydney, Portland Or: GlassHouse Press/Routledge-Cavendish 2002, reprinted with amendments, 2004) 
 (ed.) with Roshan de Silva Wijeyeratne, 'Tracking the Postcolonial in Law', Griffith Law Review, Vol. 12, No. 3 (2003)

References

British writers
British legal scholars
Academics of the University of East London
Living people
International law scholars
Middle Eastern studies scholars
Year of birth missing (living people)